This is a List of diplomats from the United Kingdom to the Two Sicilies, usually based at Naples

List of heads of mission
Until 1753, Great Britain appears only to have had consuls at Naples and Messina, and no permanent diplomatic mission.

Envoys Extraordinary to the Kingdom of Naples and/or the Kingdom of Sicily
 1753-1764: Sir James Gray, Bt
 1764-1800: Sir William Hamilton
 1800-1801: Sir Arthur Paget, also minister plenipotentiary
 1801-1803: William Drummond

Envoys Extraordinary and Ministers Plenipotentiary to the Kingdom of Naples and/or the Kingdom of Sicily
 1803-1806: Hugh Elliot
 1806: General Henry Edward Fox
 1806-1809: William Drummond
 1809-1811: William Pitt Amherst, Lord Amherst
 1811-1814: William Cavendish Bentinck (Simultaneously held supreme military command in the Mediterranean)
 1812-1814: Frederick James Lamb Accredited but never in fact in charge
 1814–1816: Sir William à Court

Envoys Extraordinary and Ministers Plenipotentiary to the Kingdom of the Two Sicilies
 1816–1822: Sir William à Court
 1822-1825: William Richard Hamilton
 1824-1832: William Noel Hill
 1825: John, Lord Burgersh special mission 1832-1833: Lord Ponsonby
 1832-1856: Hon. William Temple (ambassador)
1842-1845: Sir Woodbine Parish Plenipotentiary (jointly with Temple)
 1847: Gilbert, Earl of Minto, special mission1847-1848: Francis Napier, 10th Lord Napier Chargé d'Affaires''

References

Sicilies, Two
United Kingdom to Naples and the Two Sicilies
!UK
 United Kingdom